Mirko Bonačić (19 March 1903 – 18 October 1989) was a Croatian footballer. He competed in the men's tournament at the 1928 Summer Olympics.

International career
He made his debut for Yugoslavia in a September 1924 friendly match against Czechoslovakia and earned a total of 6 caps scoring 3 goals. His final international was a May 1928 Olympic Games match against Portugal in Amsterdam.

References

External links
 
 

1903 births
1989 deaths
Footballers from Split, Croatia
Association football midfielders
Yugoslav footballers
Yugoslavia international footballers
Olympic footballers of Yugoslavia
Footballers at the 1928 Summer Olympics
HNK Hajduk Split players
Yugoslav First League players
Burials at Lovrinac Cemetery